is a JR East railway station in Ōtsuchi, Iwate Prefecture, Japan.

Lines

Station layout
Kirikiri Station have a single side platform serving traffic in both directions.

Adjacent stations

History

Kirikiri Station opened on 5 April 1938. The station was absorbed into the JR East network upon the privatization of the Japan National Railways (JNR) on 1 April 1987. Operations on the Yamada Line between Miyako Station and Kamaishi Station were suspended after the 11 March 2011 Tōhoku earthquake and tsunami. The damaged station building was demolished in February 2012. As of 2018, the station have been rebuilt along with the rest of the closed segment of the Yamada Line. It was transferred to the Sanriku Railway upon completion on 23 March 2019. This segment joined up with the Kita-Rias Line on one side and the Minami-Rias Line on the other, which together constitutes the entire Rias Line. Accordingly, this station became an intermediate station of Rias Line.

Surrounding area
  National Route 45
 Kirikiri Post Office

References

External links
 JR East Station information 

Railway stations in Iwate Prefecture
Rias Line
Railway stations in Japan opened in 1938
Ōtsuchi, Iwate